The British Iron and Steel Research Association or BISRA, formed in 1944, was the research arm of the British steel industry. It had headquarters in London, originally at 11 Park Lane, later moved to 24 Buckingham Gate, with Laboratories in Sheffield on Hoyle Street, Swansea, Teesside, and Battersea.
The organization was created by Sir Charles Goodeve, who remained its director until his retirement in 1969. Roger Eddison was hired as a manager shortly after BISRA's founding.  BISRA's research has been responsible for much of the automation of modern steelmaking. BISRA were pioneers of digital computing in the steel industry.

BISRA was funded 15% by a grant from the government of the United Kingdom, and 85% by a cooperative of several steelmaking companies.

See also
British Steel (1967–1999)
Steel
Steelmaking
Steel mill

References

External links 
Sir Charles Goodeve Biography -- section on BISRA

1944 establishments in the United Kingdom
British research associations
Organisations based in Sheffield
Organisations based in the City of Westminster
Science and technology in South Yorkshire
Scientific organizations established in 1944
Steel industry of the United Kingdom
People from Little Horsted